Sotirović is a Serbian surname meaning "the son of Sotir" (Sotir, Greek: Sotirios) it may refer to:
Kuzman Sotirović, Yugoslav Serb footballer
Vuk Sotirović, Serbian footballer
Katarina Sotirović, Serbian singer
Dragan Sotirović Captain of the Yugoslav Army

Serbian surnames
Patronymic surnames